Afromachilis makungu is the only known member of the genus Afromachilis of the family Machilidae, which is from the order Archaeognatha. It is found in Katanga, a province of the Democratic Republic of the Congo. It has one synonym, Paramachilis makungu Wygodzinsky, 1952

References

Archaeognatha
Invertebrates of the Democratic Republic of the Congo
Insects described in 1952
Monotypic insect genera